Samuthirakani (born 26 April 1973) is an Indian actor and film director who predominantly works in Tamil films besides appearing in a number of Telugu and Malayalam films. He worked as an assistant to director K Balachander. He won the National Film Award for Best Supporting Actor in 2016 for Visaranai.

Early life
Samuthirakani was born on 26 April 1973 in Seithur, Rajapalayam, Tamil Nadu. He did his B.Sc. in Mathematics from the Rajapalayam Rajus College and he also earned a Bachelor of Law from Ambedkar Law College. However, he aimed to become an actor. He has said that people used to tell him that he did not have the physical appearanace or talent necessary to be an actor.

Career
In 1997, he joined as an assistant director under Sundar K. Vijayan. He was then noticed by K. Balachander and was recruited as assistant director for Balachander's 100th film Paarthale Paravasam. He also assisted Balachander in the mega-serial Anni telecasted by Jaya TV. Samuthirakani recalled that the work experience he gained under Balachander helped him in many ways while shooting Arasi and Selvi, the mega-serial telecasted in Sun TV, which were massive hits among housewives. 

In the early 2000s, Samuthirakani began his career as a director. He notably launched a shelved film titled Uyir Nanbanukku starring Cheran, before making Unnai Charanadaindhen (2003) for S. P. B. Charan.

However, it was the success of Naadodigal (2009) that established Samuthirakani as a director. Since then he has directed films such as Poraali (2011), Nimirndhu Nil (2014) and Appa (2016). All these films have been remade in Telugu, Kannada and Malayalam.

He directed two Telugu films Shambo Shiva Shambo (2010) and Janda Pai Kapiraju (2015).

Samuthirakani, who directed and starred in the original Appa (2016), has directed the Malayalam version Aakashamittayee (2017) along with M. Padmakumar. He also played an important role in Rajinikanth's film Kaala (2018). 

In 2020, he acted in Telugu film, Ala Vaikunthapurramuloo. Samuthirakani's returned to directing with Naadodigal 2, a film that takes up the topic of equality. In 2021, he played the main role in the Telugu film, Aakashavaani. He also directed and acted in the fantasy comedy drama Vinodhaya Sitham.

Filmography

Acting roles

Films

Television

Dubbing artist

As director
Films

Television

Singer

Narrator
Sundara Pandian (2012)
Serndhu Polama (2015)
Anandham Vilayadum Veedu (2021)

References

External links
 
 Opera king
 His still dreams to make it
 Instagram

Living people
Tamil film directors
Tamil male actors
1973 births
Tamil Nadu State Film Awards winners
Best Supporting Actor National Film Award winners
Indian male voice actors
Male actors in Tamil cinema
Male actors in Malayalam cinema
Indian male film actors
Male actors from Tamil Nadu
People from Virudhunagar district
20th-century Indian male actors
21st-century Indian film directors
Film directors from Tamil Nadu
Kannada film directors
Malayalam film directors
Male actors in Telugu cinema
21st-century Indian male actors
Tamil male television actors